An uncontrolled decompression is an undesired drop in the pressure of a sealed system, such as an aircraft cabin or hyperbaric chamber, that typically results from human error, structural failure, or impact, causing the pressurised vessel to vent into its surroundings or fail to pressurize at all.

Such decompression may be classed as explosive, rapid, or slow:
 Explosive decompression (ED) is violent and too fast for air to escape safely from the lungs and other air-filled cavities in the body such as the sinuses and eustachian tubes, typically resulting in severe to fatal barotrauma.
 Rapid decompression may be slow enough to allow cavities to vent but may still cause serious barotrauma or discomfort.
 Slow or gradual decompression occurs so slowly that it may not be sensed before hypoxia sets in.

Description

The term uncontrolled decompression here refers to the unplanned depressurisation of vessels that are occupied by people; for example, a pressurised aircraft cabin at high altitude, a spacecraft, or a hyperbaric chamber. For the catastrophic failure of other pressure vessels used to contain gas, liquids, or reactants under pressure, the term explosion is more commonly used, or other specialised terms such as BLEVE may apply to particular situations.

Decompression can occur due to structural failure of the pressure vessel, or failure of the compression system itself.  The speed and violence of the decompression is affected by the size of the pressure vessel, the differential pressure between the inside and outside of the vessel, and the size of the leak hole.

The US Federal Aviation Administration recognizes three distinct types of decompression events in aircraft: explosive, rapid, and gradual decompression.

Explosive decompression

Explosive decompression occurs at a rate swifter than that at which air can escape from the lungs, typically in less than 0.1 to 0.5 seconds.  The risk of lung trauma is very high, as is the danger from any unsecured objects that can become projectiles because of the explosive force, which may be likened to a bomb detonation.

Immediately after an explosive decompression, a heavy fog may fill the aircraft cabin as the air cools, raising the relative humidity and causing sudden condensation.  Military pilots with oxygen masks must pressure-breathe, whereby the lungs fill with air when relaxed, and effort has to be exerted to expel the air again.

Rapid decompression
Rapid decompression typically takes more than 0.1 to 0.5 seconds, allowing the lungs to decompress more quickly than the cabin. The risk of lung damage is still present, but significantly reduced compared with explosive decompression.

Gradual decompression

Slow, or gradual, decompression occurs slowly enough to go unnoticed and might only be detected by instruments. This type of decompression may also come about from a failure to cabin pressurization as an aircraft climbs to altitude. An example of this is the 2005 Helios Airways Flight 522 crash, in which the maintenance service left the pressurization system in manual mode and the pilots did not check the pressurization system. As a result, they suffered a loss of consciousness (as well as most of the passengers and crew) due to hypoxia (lack of oxygen). The plane continued to fly due to the autopilot system and eventually crashed due to fuel exhaustion after leaving its flight path.

Decompression injuries

The following physical injuries may be associated with decompression incidents:

Hypoxia is the most serious  risk associated with decompression, especially as it may go undetected or incapacitate the aircrew.
Barotrauma: an inability to equalize pressure in internal air spaces such as the middle ear or gastrointestinal tract, or more serious injury such as a burst lung.
Decompression sickness.
Altitude sickness.
Frostbite or hypothermia from exposure to freezing cold air at high altitude.
 Physical trauma caused by the violence of explosive decompression, which can turn people and loose objects into projectiles.
At least two confirmed cases have been documented of a person being blown through an airplane passenger window. The first occurred in 1973 when debris from an engine failure struck a window roughly midway in the fuselage. Despite efforts to pull the passenger back into the airplane, the occupant was forced entirely through the cabin window. The passenger's skeletal remains were eventually found by a construction crew, and were positively identified two years later. The second incident occurred on April 17, 2018 when a woman on Southwest Airlines Flight 1380 was partially blown through an airplane passenger window that had broken from a similar engine failure. Although the other passengers were able to pull her back inside, she later died from her injuries. In both incidents, the plane landed safely with the sole fatality being the person seated next to the window involved.

According to NASA scientist Geoffrey A. Landis, the effect depends on the size of the hole, which can be expanded by debris that is blown through it; "it would take about 100 seconds for pressure to equalise through a roughly  hole in the fuselage of a Boeing 747." Anyone blocking the hole would have half a ton of force pushing them towards it, but this force reduces rapidly with distance from the hole.

Implications for aircraft design
Modern aircraft are specifically designed with longitudinal and circumferential reinforcing ribs in order to prevent localised damage from tearing the whole fuselage open during a decompression incident. However, decompression events have nevertheless proved fatal for aircraft in other ways. In 1974, explosive decompression onboard Turkish Airlines Flight 981 caused the floor to collapse, severing vital flight control cables in the process. Manufacturers were able to comply with the Directive either by strengthening the floors and/or installing relief vents called "dado panels" between the passenger cabin and the cargo compartment.

Cabin doors are designed to make it nearly impossible to lose pressurization through opening a cabin door in flight, either accidentally or intentionally. The plug door design ensures that when the pressure inside the cabin exceeds the pressure outside, the doors are forced shut and will not open until the pressure is equalized. Cabin doors, including the emergency exits, but not all cargo doors, open inwards, or must first be pulled inwards and then rotated before they can be pushed out through the door frame because at least one dimension of the door is larger than the door frame.  Pressurization prevented the doors of Saudia Flight 163 from being opened on the ground after the aircraft made a successful emergency landing, resulting in the deaths of all 287 passengers and 14 crew members from fire and smoke.

In 1996, the FAA adopted Amendment 25–87, which imposed additional high-altitude cabin-pressure specifications, for new designs of aircraft types. For aircraft certified to operate above 25,000 feet (FL 250; 7,600 m), it "must be designed so that occupants will not be exposed to cabin pressure altitudes in excess of  after any probable failure condition in the pressurization system." In practice, that new FAR amendment imposes an operational ceiling of 40,000 feet on the majority of newly designed commercial aircraft.

In 2004, Airbus successfully petitioned the FAA to allow cabin pressure of the A380 to reach  in the event of a decompression incident and to exceed  for one minute.  This special exemption allows the A380 to operate at a higher altitude than other newly designed civilian aircraft, which have not yet been granted a similar exemption.

International standards
The Depressurization Exposure Integral (DEI) is a quantitative model that is used by the FAA to enforce compliance with decompression-related design directives.  The model relies on the fact that the pressure that the subject is exposed to and the duration of that exposure are the two most important variables at play in a decompression event.

Other national and international standards for explosive decompression testing include:
MIL-STD-810, 202
RTCA/DO-160
NORSOK M710
API 17K and 17J
NACE TM0192 and TM0297
TOTALELFFINA SP TCS 142 Appendix H

Notable decompression accidents and incidents
Decompression incidents are not uncommon on military and civilian aircraft, with approximately 40–50 rapid decompression events occurring worldwide annually. However, in most cases the problem is manageable, injuries or structural damage rare and the incident not considered notable.  One notable, recent case was Southwest Airlines Flight 1380 in 2018, where an uncontained engine failure ruptured a window, causing a passenger to be partially blown out.

Decompression incidents do not occur solely in aircraft; the Byford Dolphin accident is an example of violent explosive decompression of a saturation diving system on an oil rig.  A decompression event is an effect of a failure caused by another problem (such as an explosion or mid-air collision), but the decompression event may worsen the initial issue.

Myths

A bullet through a window may cause explosive decompression
In 2004, the TV show MythBusters examined whether explosive decompression occurs when a bullet is fired through the fuselage of an airplane informally by way of several tests using a decommissioned pressurised DC-9. A single shot through the side or the window did not have any effect – it took actual explosives to cause explosive decompression – suggesting that the fuselage is designed to prevent people from being blown out. Professional pilot David Lombardo states that a bullet hole would have no perceived effect on cabin pressure as the hole would be smaller than the opening of the aircraft's outflow valve.

NASA scientist Geoffrey A. Landis points out though that the impact depends on the size of the hole, which can be expanded by debris that is blown through it. Landis went on to say that "it would take about 100 seconds for pressure to equalise through a roughly  hole in the fuselage of a Boeing 747." He then stated that anyone sitting next to the hole would have about half a ton of force pulling them towards it. At least two confirmed cases have been documented of a person being blown through an airplane passenger window. The first occurred in 1973 when debris from an engine failure struck a window roughly midway in the fuselage. Despite efforts to pull the passenger back into the airplane, the occupant was forced entirely through the cabin window. The passenger's skeletal remains were eventually found by a construction crew, and were positively identified two years later. The second incident occurred on April 17, 2018 when a woman on Southwest Airlines Flight 1380 was partially blown through an airplane passenger window that had broken from a similar engine failure. Although the other passengers were able to pull her back inside, she later died from her injuries. In both incidents, the plane landed safely with the sole fatality being the person seated next to the window involved. Fictional accounts of this include a scene in Goldfinger, when James Bond kills the eponymous villain by blowing him out a passenger window and Die Another Day, when an errant gunshot shatters a window on a cargo plane and rapidly expands, causing multiple North Korean Military Officials and henchmen of the main villain, Colonel Moon (aka Gustav Graves) to be sucked out to their deaths.  Bond even cheekily remarks "Looks like your friends have bailed."

Exposure to a vacuum causes the body to explode

This  persistent myth is based on a failure to distinguish between two types of decompression and their exaggerated portrayal in some fictional works. The first type of decompression deals with changing from normal atmospheric pressure (one atmosphere) to a vacuum (zero atmosphere) which is usually centered around space exploration. The second type of decompression changes from exceptionally high pressure (many atmospheres) to normal atmospheric pressure (one atmosphere) as may occur in deep-sea diving.

The first type is more common as pressure reduction from normal atmospheric pressure to a vacuum can be found in both space exploration and high-altitude aviation. Research and experience have shown that while exposure to a vacuum causes swelling, human skin is tough enough to withstand the drop of one atmosphere. The most serious risk from vacuum exposure is hypoxia, in which the body is starved of oxygen, leading to unconsciousness within a few seconds. Rapid uncontrolled decompression can be much more dangerous than vacuum exposure itself. Even if the victim does not hold their breath, venting through the windpipe may be too slow to prevent the fatal rupture of the delicate alveoli of the lungs. Eardrums and sinuses may also be ruptured by rapid decompression, and soft tissues may be affected by bruises seeping blood. If the victim somehow survives, the stress and shock would accelerate oxygen consumption, leading to hypoxia at a rapid rate. This measure of altitude is known as the Armstrong limit, which is the practical limit to survivable altitude without pressurization. Fictional accounts of bodies exploding due to exposure from a vacuum include, among others, several incidents in the movie Outland, while in the movie Total Recall, characters appear to suffer effects of ebullism and blood boiling when exposed to the atmosphere of Mars.

The second type is rare since it involves a pressure drop over several atmospheres, which would require the person to have been placed in a pressure vessel. The only likely situation in which this might occur is during decompression after deep-sea diving. A pressure drop as small as 100 Torr (13 kPa), which produces no symptoms if it is gradual, may be fatal if it occurs suddenly. One such incident occurred in 1983 in the North Sea, where violent explosive decompression from nine atmospheres to one caused four divers to die instantly from massive and lethal barotrauma. Dramatized fictional accounts of this include a scene from the film Licence to Kill, when a character's head explodes after his hyperbaric chamber is rapidly depressurized, and another in the film DeepStar Six, wherein rapid depressurization causes a character to hemorrhage profusely before exploding in a similar fashion.

See also

Notes

References

External links
Human Exposure to Vacuum
Will an astronaut explode if he takes off his helmet?

Mechanical failure modes
Aviation accidents and incidents
Aviation medicine
Diving medicine